Luigi Cacciatore (1900–1951) was an Italian socialist politician who served as the minister of posts and communications in 1947. He was a member and one of the leaders of the Italian Socialist Party.

Biography
Cacciatore was born in Mercato San Severino, near Salerno, on 26 July 1900. From 1922 he worked in the building trade unions. In 1925 he was arrested by the Fascist regime due to his activities. After the end of the Fascist rule he involved in politics. In the first meeting of the Italian Socialist Party of Proletarian Unity in Naples on 20 December 1943 he was elected to its National Council representing the province of Salerno. He was appointed minister of posts and communications to the third cabinet of Prime Minister Alcide De Gasperi in 1947. Then Cacciatore joined the Italian Socialist Party. He was elected to the Italian Parliament from Benevento and represented the party at the parliament between 1 June 1948 to 17 August 1951. He died in Rome on 17 August 1951. Spencer M. Di Scala argues that the death of Cacciatore weakened the Italian Socialist Party.

References

External links

1900 births
1951 deaths
Government ministers of Italy
Italian anti-fascists
Italian Socialist Party politicians
Italian Socialist Party of Proletarian Unity politicians
People from Salerno
Italian prisoners and detainees
Deputies of Legislature I of Italy